Jair Antonio Meneguelli (born 16 July 1947) is a Brazilian politician and former trade union leader.

Born in São Caetano do Sul, Meneguelli studied at the Colégio Barão do Rio Branco before becoming a toolmaker.  He found work with Willys Overland, which soon became part of Ford of Brazil.  In 1977, he joined the Metalworkers' Union of São Bernardo do Campo and Diadema, and the following year he took part in a major campaign for wage increases.  Through this, he came to know Lula, and Meneguelli was a founder member of the Workers' Party (PT) in 1980.

In 1981, Meneguelli became president of the Metalworkers' Union, after Lula had been removed from office by the government.  Two years later, he took it into the new Central Única dos Trabalhadores (CUT), and at the first CUT congress, in 1984, he was elected as its president.  The CUT played a leading role in increasing industrial action, culminating in the 1986 general strike.  In 1987, he stood down from the Metalworkers' Union, to focus on the CUT and the PT.

Meneguelli stood down as leader of the CUT in 1994, and was elected as a deputy in the 1994 Brazilian general election.  In 1995/96, he also served as deputy leader of PT.  In 2000, he unsuccessfully ran to become mayor of São Caetano do Sul.  He lost his parliamentary seat in 2002, being appointed as president of the Industrial Social Services.

References

1947 births
Living people
People from São Caetano do Sul
Brazilian trade unionists
Workers' Party (Brazil) politicians
Members of the Chamber of Deputies (Brazil) from São Paulo